Juliette Brindak Blake is an American businesswoman and co-founder and Chief Executive Officer of the all-girl tween and teen social networking site, Miss O & Friends.

Early life 
Juliette Brindak was born in New York City, and was raised in Greenwich, Connecticut by Paul and Hermine Brindak. She is one of two children.

Life and career

Miss O & Friends 
Brindak runs Miss O & Friends, which she began as a hobby since 2005 when she was 16 years old. The company was inspired by drawings which Brindak did when she was ten. Miss O and Friends is a safe socialization site for tween and young teen girls that aims to empower and help build self-esteem. The website is COPPA compliant safe. The content is created by the user community making it totally by girls, for girls. In 2011, Miss O and Friends was ranked the #3 girls-only website, according to Alexa data.

As of 2012, the website's value was $15 million, according to Procter & Gamble which was an early investor. The company is based in Old Greeenwich, Connecticut and has employees across the United States and Canada. Inc. Magazine named Miss O and Friend “Coolest College Start Ups.

In 2012, Brindak was a speaker at TEDx Bay Area. The same year, she launched Moms with Girls.

In 2017, she became an executive producer of a Youtube Premium original television series, Hyperlinked, based on her story (which includes a namesake character based on her).

Bibliography 
Miss O & Friends: Write On! The Miss O & Friends Collection of Rockin' Fiction, Watson-Guptill, 2006, a compilation of stories submitted by users of the site.

Personal life 
On August 6, 2016 she married Christian Joseph Blake of Greenwich, Connecticut.

Brindak received her BA in anthropology and public health at Washington University in St. Louis.

References

External links
 Miss O & Friends
 Juliette Brindak at TEDxBayArea

Living people
1989 births
Greenwich High School alumni
American women chief executives
Washington University in St. Louis alumni
American company founders
American women company founders